Roots & Shoots was founded by Jane Goodall, DBE in 1991 with the goal of bringing together youth from preschool to university age to work on environmental, conservation and humanitarian issues. The organization has local chapters in over 140 countries with over 8000 local groups worldwide that involve nearly 150,000 youth. Many of the chapters operate through schools and other organizations. Participants are encouraged to identify and work on problems in their own communities affecting people, animals, or the environment. Charity Navigator has awarded Roots & Shoots and its parent non-profit organization, the Jane Goodall Institute, its highest four-star rating for accountability and transparency, with 78.1% of its expenses going directly to the programs.

Origin
Roots & Shoots was founded in 1991, when Dr. Goodall started to give talks at local schools in Tanzania. A group of 12 of her students, selected by their classmates, met with Goodall at her home to discuss their local environmental concerns, figuring out what they could do to help. These 12 students became the first members of Roots & Shoots, and the organization grew from there. Of the original 12 students, one eventually went on to serve as the minister of environment for Tanzania. Another became the Roots & Shoots' national director for Tanzania.

Curricula

The Roots & Shoots curriculum is a learning program for teachers and other community leaders to use with students and young people to help them develop environmental, conservationist, and humanitarian programs to improve their communities. It is intended that through service projects, students develop a sense of service and leadership in their own communities. The curriculum is split into elementary, middle and high school lesson plans. The program encourages young people to create projects that support campaigns. Roots & Shoots provides resources about how to integrate these projects into the local community. A major tenet of the Roots & Shoots model is to use science and technology to map out community needs in order to find the places in a community where a campaign or service projects can help people, animals, or the environment. Roots & Shoots also uses technology to train club leaders through its online course, "Turning Learners into Leaders: Empowering Youth Through Service Innovation". The professional development course provides community leaders with training in community mapping, fostering leadership in young people, collaborating with community stakeholders, and guiding young leaders towards practical solutions for community campaigns.

Branches
There are active Roots & Shoots branches in at least 27 countries, with offices in Abu Dhabi, Argentina, Australia, Austria, Belgium, China, Canada, Columbia, Republic of the Congo, Democratic Republic of Congo, France, Germany, Hong Kong, Indonesia, Italy, Kenya, Puerto Rico, Nepal, New Zealand, Singapore, South Africa, Spain, Taiwan, Tanzania, Uganda, the United Kingdom, and the United States.

China
China has four main Roots & Shoots branches in Beijing, Shanghai, Chengdu, and Hong Kong that support over 600 primarily school groups.

Taiwan
In Taiwan, Roots and Shoots has been established in many schools and universities.

United States

Tulsa, Oklahoma
Riverfield Country Day School in Tulsa has implemented the Roots & Shoots program.

Tucson, Arizona
Empire High School in Tucson has also implemented the Roots & Shoots program.

References

External links
 Roots & Shoots
 Jane Goodall Institute

Jane Goodall
Nature conservation organizations based in the United States
Environmental organizations based in Virginia
International environmental organizations
Organizations established in 1991
Wildlife conservation organizations
1991 establishments in the United States